The Șapte Izvoare is a right tributary of the river Bâsca Mică in Romania. It flows into the Bâsca Mică in the village Secuiu.

References

Rivers of Romania
Rivers of Buzău County